Antonio Delli Rocioli Ferreira better known as Antonio Delli is a Venezuelan actor of television, theater, films, announcer and dubbing. Born in Caracas, Venezuela. Delli ventured into television in 2006 in the Venezuelan telenovela Ciudad Bendita.

Biography 
Delli began doing theater at the same time of studying administration in the Universidad Católica Andrés Bello. But later he decided to leave the university and began to form as an actor in the National Theater Workshop at the Rajatabla Foundation, and later graduated with a degree in Social Communication at the Universidad Central de Venezuela.

Filmography

References

External links 
 

Living people
Venezuelan male telenovela actors
Venezuelan male television actors
Venezuelan film actors
Venezuelan stage actors
Venezuelan male voice actors
Male actors from Caracas
21st-century Venezuelan male actors
Year of birth missing (living people)